Glutton may refer to:

 One who over-indulges in and over-consumes food, drink, or intoxicants to the point of waste. See Gluttony
 Another name for the wolverine